The Austrian band Erste Allgemeine Verunsicherung released sixteen studio albums, one live album, one extended play and forty-one singles since their foundation in 1978.

Chart performance

Studio albums

Singles

Non-German singles
 1983: Alp-Rapp (Swedish version of "Der Alpen-Rap")
 1986: Ba-Ba-Bankrobbery (English version of "Ba-Ba-Banküberfall", peaked at #63 on the UK Singles Chart)

Compilation albums

Extended plays

Footnotes 
 1 = released under the alias Ossi Ostborn (roughly translated: "Easterner Eastborn", but the name also sounds phonetically like Ozzy Osbourne), the song refers to the reunification of East Germany and West Germany
 2 = released under the alias The Himbeer Teddies ("The Raspberry Teddies"), the songs satirize the style of music Schlager
 3 = released under the alias Klaus Eberhartinger & Die Gruftgranaten ("Klaus Eberhartinger & The Tomb Bombshells"), the album parodies several Austropop hit songs. It also refers to the national flag of Austria, which colors are red-white-red (Rot-Weiß-Rot) in German language.

References

Discographies of Austrian artists
Pop music group discographies